E is a service on the S-train network in Copenhagen. It runs between Køge and Holte, serving the outer end of the Køge radial and the inner part of the Hillerød radial. The A service serves the complementary parts of each radial, and both lines serves all stations on the central part between Ny Ellebjerg and Hellerup.

Trains run on weekdays only, every 20 minutes from about 5:00 to 6:00 and every 10 minutes about 6:00 to 20:00.

History
Service E is the continuation of the "fast" steam trains that ran between Copenhagen and Hillerød since the late 19th century. They acquired a service letter when they were replaced by S-trains in 1986. Later the main characteristic of service E came to be serving the outer end of the Køge radial.

An Ex service first ran from 1968, but was fused with service Cx in 1972. A new Ex line started in 1983 servicing the Køge radial.

References

S-train (Copenhagen)